Marek Seman (born 27 February 1976) is a Slovak football defender who currently plays for TJ Rozvoj Pušovce. His former club was Partizán Bardejov.

External links
at fotbal.idnes.cz
at eurofotbal.cz

References

1976 births
Living people
Slovak footballers
Association football midfielders
AS Trenčín players
1. FC Tatran Prešov players
FK Dukla Banská Bystrica players
1. FC Slovácko players
FK Bodva Moldava nad Bodvou players
Slovak Super Liga players
Partizán Bardejov players